The 2015 Nigerian Senate election in Cross River State was held on March 28, 2015, to elect members of the Nigerian Senate to represent Cross River State. John Enoh representing Cross River Central, Gershom Bassey representing Cross River South and Rose Okoji Oko representing Cross River North all won on the platform of the People's Democratic Party.

Overview

Summary

Results

Cross River Central 
People's Democratic Party (Nigeria) candidate John Enoh won the election, defeating All Progressives Congress candidate Charles Ogida and other party candidates.

Cross River South 
People's Democratic Party (Nigeria) candidate Gershom Bassey won the election, defeating All Progressives Congress candidate Maria Ukpanyang and other party candidates.

Cross River North 
People's Democratic Party (Nigeria) candidate Rose Oko won the election, defeating All Progressives Congress candidate Kanjal Akorhim and other party candidates.

References 

March 2015 events in Nigeria